CX 4 Radio Rural is a Uruguayan Spanish-language AM radio station that broadcasts from Montevideo.

History
Founded by Domingo Bordaberry, who was lawyer and landowner, the programs of this radio have always been devoted to livestock and agriculture.

Some of its most notable media personalities made history in Uruguay:
 Benito Nardone
 Eduardo J. Corso

References

External links
 610 AM

Spanish-language radio stations
Radio in Uruguay
Mass media in Montevideo